HMS Wren (D88/I88) was an Admiralty modified W class destroyer built for the Royal Navy.  She was ordered in April 1918 from Yarrow Shipbuilders Limited under the 13th Order for Destroyers of the Emergency War Program of 1918–19. She was the third Royal Navy ship to carry the name, which was introduced in 1653.

Construction 
HMS Wrens keel was laid in June 1918 at the Yarrow Shipbuilders Limited, Scotstoun.  The signing of the armistice with Germany led to the cancellation of 35 destroyers out of Wrens class of 56, but she survived this and the cancellation of a further seven vessels in September 1919.  Wren was launched on 11 November 1919, after which she was towed to the dockyard at Pembroke Dock for completion.

Inter War Years 
After a delay, she was commissioned into the Royal Navy on 23 January 1923 with pennant number D88.  After commissioning she was assigned to the 4th Destroyer Flotilla of the Atlantic Fleet.  She served mainly in home waters and in 1938 was assigned as rescue ship for the Home Fleet carriers.

Second World War 
In September 1939 Wren was transferred to the 16th Destroyer Flotilla at Portsmouth for convoy defence and anti-submarine patrols in the English Channel and Southwest Approaches. In November she was transferred to Nore Command for convoy defence in the North Sea. Wren was reassigned to the 18th Destroyer Flotilla, Western Approaches Command in January 1940 and undertook convoy defence once more in the Southwest Approaches.  Following the German invasion of Norway in April 1940 she transferred to Scapa Floe to carry out convoy escort duties to Norway. She provided gunfire support to the British landings at Bjerkvik but returned to convoy duties and did not take part in the evacuation of the British expeditionary force. At the end of May her pennant number was changed to I88 for visual signalling purposes. On 25 June she returned to the 16th Destroyer Flotilla based at Harwich for convoy escort and patrol duties in Nore Command.

Loss
On 27 July 1940 Wren, alongside Montrose, was providing anti-aircraft protection for minesweeping operations off Aldeburgh, Suffolk.  She came under heavy and sustained dive bombing attack by 15 Junkers Ju 87 aircraft and was damaged by several near misses which holed her below the waterline.  Collapsed bulkheads caused heavy flooding which led her to sink quickly, killing 37 of her crew.  Wrens survivors were rescued by the minesweepers.

Notes

Bibliography

External links 
 Service History of HMS Wren Naval History Web Site
 Uboat.net HMS Wren

 

V and W-class destroyers of the Royal Navy
1919 ships
World War II destroyers of the United Kingdom
Ships built on the River Clyde
Maritime incidents in July 1940